The Nokia X1-01 is an ultra-basic phone manufactured by Nokia for users in developing countries. It is a dual SIM phone. The Nokia X1-01 features 2G or GPRS mobile connectivity. The Nokia X1-01 however does not feature any internet connectivity, web browsing or social media capabilities, and apps cannot be installed by the user. The Nokia X1-01 also does not have camera, GPS, or Bluetooth hardware available.

The phone runs on Li-ion battery which can last up to 42 days with the phone on standby.

The phone can play standard MP3 files with bitrate greater than 32 kilobits per second, with advertised 36 hours of battery life. It uses a microSD card for storage. It also runs FM radio and also has some games pre-installed.

References

X1-01
Mobile phones introduced in 2011
Mobile phones with user-replaceable battery